The Regional District of Central Kootenay  (RDCK) is a regional district in the province of British Columbia, Canada. As of the 2016 census, the population was 59,517. The area is 22,130.72 square kilometres.  The administrative centre is located in the city of Nelson. Other municipalities include the City of Castlegar, the Town of Creston, the Village of Salmo, the Village of Nakusp, the Village of Kaslo, the Village of New Denver, the Village of Silverton, the Village of Ymir and the Village of Slocan (known locally as Slocan City to distinguish it from the appellation "the Slocan" for the entire Slocan Valley).

Demographics 

Note: Totals greater than 100% due to multiple origin responses.

Municipalities

Unincorporated communities

Notes

References

BC Stats 2011-2016 Census Results

External links

 
Central Kootenay